Bubali Sport Club, known also as Bubali SC, or simply Bubali, is an Aruban football club based in Noord, They are currently playing in Aruba's Division Uno, after relegation from Division di Honor where they finished 10th in the 2021–22 season.

Achievements
Aruban Division di Honor: 1
1975

Copa Betico Croes: 0
 Finalist: 2 
 2010, 2014

Players

Current squad
As of 10 September 2022

Current technical staff

External links
Official website 
Fan website 
Division Uno

References 

Football clubs in Aruba
1943 establishments in Aruba
Association football clubs established in 1943